Pardis is a city in Iran.

Pardis may also refer to:

 Pardis, Khuzestan, a village in Khuzestan Province, Iran
 Pardis Parker, writer, actor, and comedian
 Pardis Sabeti, American geneticist